Virtual Pascal is a free 32-bit Pascal compiler, IDE, and debugger for OS/2 and Microsoft Windows, with some limited Linux support. Virtual Pascal was developed by Vitaly Miryanov and later maintained by Allan Mertner.

Features
The compiler is compatible with Turbo Pascal, Borland Delphi, and Free Pascal, although language- and RTL-compatibility is limited for features introduced after Delphi v2 and FPC 1.0.x.

VP was primarily useful for the following purposes:
 Easily port existing 16-bit Turbo Pascal programs to 32 bits 
 Port existing 16-bit OWL programs to 32-bit Windows (in theory)
 Write console (text-mode) programs for several platforms
 Pascal development using the 32-bit Windows API (the classic development, no COM)
 Learn object-oriented programming

Significant features of Virtual Pascal include:
 Text-mode IDE
 Debugger is integrated directly into the IDE and is reminiscent of Turbo Debugger
 Fast compilation
 Tool-chain written mostly in Intel assembly

History

Microsoft Windows, OS/2
The compiler was quite popular in the BBS scene, probably because of its OS/2 port and being one of the few affordable multi-target compilers. Also Turbo Pascal had been popular in the BBS scene too, but its successor, Delphi was suddenly for Windows only. Virtual Pascal provided a migration path for existing codebases.

There has been pressure from some users for Virtual Pascal to be made into open-source software. This has not been done, provided the following reasoning:
 The compiler source is mostly written in Intel assembly which is hard to change and maintain.
 Part of the run-time library is proprietary to Borland (The FreePascal run-time library was ported to VirtualPascal by Noah Silva, however newer versions of the FreePascal RTL use features of the FreePascal compiler which are not supported by VirtualPascal, and so can not be ported).  
 The patch/diff tool to work around the above (provide changes to proprietary without distributing parts of the original) was proprietary and (Windows) 16 bit only.
 Documentation and help are maintained with expensive (and sometimes no longer available) proprietary tools
 There is nobody who fully understands the code. Allan said that some of the deeper areas were no-touch for him (original code by Vitaly)

Although it had a wide user base in the late 1990s, VP has not evolved significantly since 2001, and after a few maintenance-only releases, the owner declared that development had ceased in 2005.

On 4 Apr 2005, Virtual Pascal was announced 'dead' on the official site. The last released version (2.1 Build 279) was announced on 13 May 2004.

Linux
An initial version was released on 4 July 1999, with the last known version released on 26 September 1999. This version was maintained by Jörg Pleumann. Run-Time Library to 32 bit DPMI.

See also 
Free Pascal

References

External links 
fPrint (UK) Ltd page: OS/2, Windows 95/98/NT
Jörg Pleumann page: Virtual Pascal for Linux
Community set up by the author of Virtual Pascal
Download site that has the last version

Pascal (programming language) compilers
Freeware
Assembly language software
Pascal (programming language) software
1995 software
Products and services discontinued in 2005